Adam Samuel James Foulds FRSL (born 8 October 1974) is a British novelist and poet.

Biography
Foulds was educated at Bancroft's School, read English at St Catherine's College, Oxford under Craig Raine, and graduated with an MA in creative writing from the University of East Anglia in 2001.

In 2007, Foulds published his first book, The Truth About These Strange Times. The novel, which is set in the present day, is concerned in part with the World Memory Championships.

In 2008, Foulds published a substantial narrative poem entitled The Broken Word, described by the critic Peter Kemp as a "verse novella". It is a fictional version of some events during the Mau Mau Uprising. Writing in The Guardian, David Wheatley suggested that "The Broken Word is a moving and pitiless depiction of the world as it is rather than as we might like it to be, and the terrible things we do to defend our place in it".

In 2009, his novel The Quickening Maze was published. Recommending the work in a 'books of the year' survey, novelist Julian Barnes declared: 'Having last year greatly admired Adam Foulds's long poem "The Broken Word", I uncharitably wondered whether his novel The Quickening Maze (Cape) might allow me to tacitly advise him to stick to verse. Some hope: this story of the Victorian lunatic asylum where the poet John Clare and Tennyson's brother Septimus were incarcerated is the real thing. It's not a "poetic novel" either, but a novelistic novel, rich in its understanding and representation of the mad, the sane, and that large overlapping category in between'.

On 7 January 2010, he was published on the Guardian Website's "Over by Over" (OBO) coverage of day five of the Third Test of the South Africa v England series at Newlands, Cape Town. Foulds's published email corrected the OBO writer, Andy Bull, who, in the 77th over, posted lines by Donne in reference to Ian Ronald Bell in verse form: "No doubt I won't be the first pedant to let you know that the Donne you quote is in fact from a prose meditation. The experiment in retrofitting twentieth century free verse technique to it is interesting but the line breaks shouldn't really be there."

In 2013 he was included in the Granta list of 20 best young writers,.

He currently lives in Toronto, Ontario, Canada after marrying Canadian photographer Charla Jones.

Awards and honours

Selected bibliography
2007: The Truth About These Strange Times
2008: The Broken Word
2009: The Quickening Maze
2014: In the Wolf's Mouth
2019: Dream Sequence

See also 
 List of winners and shortlisted authors of the Booker Prize for Fiction

References 

1974 births
Living people
People educated at Bancroft's School
Alumni of St Catherine's College, Oxford
Alumni of the University of East Anglia
Costa Book Award winners
Fellows of the Royal Society of Literature
British writers